is a Japanese football manager.

Playing career
Shiraishi was born in Takamatsu, Kagawa, and only began playing football in his last year of high school.

After failing to break into the Meiji University football team in his native Japan, Shiraishi moved to Argentina, where he spent four years with Gimnasia. After failing to settle at Gimnasia, where his money and clothes were stolen regularly, he moved to France, where he played semi-professionally for three years.

Managerial career
Having not succeeded as a player, Shiraishi decided to go into football management, and would spend time at Feyenoord and Arsenal, before working as a coach for the Barcelona youth teams. After coaching the youth teams of fellow Spanish side Sant Gabriel, he was invited to manage the women's team, where he served between 2012 and 2013. Following this, he had spells as the assistant coach at Gavà and Europa. While at Europa, he served as interim coach after the departure of Albert Poch, until the arrival of Joan Esteva.

He worked with Keisuke Honda as a performance analyst during the former Japanese international's time with AC Milan and Pachuca.

In June 2018 he was named assistant manager of Dutch club Excelsior. A year later, in September 2019, he was named assistant to Nicky Hayen at the academy of Belgian club Sint-Truiden. When Hayen was named interim manager of the first team in November of the same year, Shiraishi followed suit.

Following the acquisition of Belgian club K.M.S.K. Deinze by Singaporean investment group ACA Football Partners in February 2022, Shiraishi was named director of football at the club. When head coach Wim De Decker left his role in May 2022, Shiraishi was named as his replacement. However, he only lasted seven games before leaving in September of the same year.

Managerial statistics

References

1975 births
Living people
Association football people from Kagawa Prefecture
Meiji University alumni
Japanese footballers
Association football forwards
Club de Gimnasia y Esgrima La Plata footballers
OGC Nice players
Blagnac FC players
Hyères FC players
Japanese football managers
K.M.S.K. Deinze managers
Japanese expatriate footballers
Japanese expatriate sportspeople in Argentina
Expatriate footballers in Argentina
Japanese expatriate sportspeople in France
Expatriate footballers in France
Japanese expatriate sportspeople in the Netherlands
Japanese expatriate sportspeople in England
Japanese expatriate sportspeople in Italy
Japanese expatriate sportspeople in Mexico
Japanese expatriate sportspeople in Spain
Japanese expatriate sportspeople in Belgium
Expatriate football managers in Belgium